Ek Ruka Hua Faisla (English: A Pending Decision) is an Indian Hindi-language thriller film, directed by Basu Chatterjee. It is a remake of the Golden Bear winning American motion picture 12 Angry Men (1957) directed by Sidney Lumet which was an adaptation from a 1954 teleplay of the same name by Reginald Rose.

Plot
The story begins in a courtroom where a teenage boy from a city slum is on trial for stabbing his father to death. Final closing arguments have been presented, and the judge then instructs the jury to decide whether the boy is guilty of murder, which carries a mandatory death sentence. Once inside the Jury discussion room, it is immediately apparent that all jurors with the sole exception of Juror Number 8 (K.K. Raina) have already decided that the boy is guilty, and that they plan to return their verdict quickly, without taking time for discussion. His vote annoys the other jurors.

The rest of the film revolves around the jury's difficulty in reaching a unanimous verdict. While several of the jurors harbor personal prejudices, Juror 8 maintains that the evidence presented in the case is circumstantial, and that the boy deserves a fair deliberation. He calls into question the accuracy and reliability of the only two witnesses to the murder, the rarity of the murder weapon (a common pocketknife, of which he has an identical copy), and the overall questionable circumstances (including the fact that an elevated train was passing by at the time of the murder). He further argues that he cannot in good conscience vote "guilty" when he feels there is reasonable doubt of the boy's guilt and slowly convinces each juror about the same by his logical findings around each piece of evidence.

Cast
 Deepak Qazir Kejriwal as Juror No. 1
 Amitabh Srivastav as Juror No. 2
 Pankaj Kapur as Juror No. 3
 S. M. Zaheer as Juror No. 4
 Subhash Udgata as Juror No. 5
 Hemant Mishra as Juror No. 6
 M. K. Raina as Juror No. 7
 K. K. Raina as Juror No. 8
 Annu Kapoor as Juror No. 9
 Subbiraj as Juror No. 10
 Shailendra Goel as Juror No. 11
 Aziz Qureshi as Juror No. 12
 C. D. Sindhu as Gatekeeper

References

External links
 

1986 films
1980s Hindi-language films
1986 drama films
Films directed by Basu Chatterjee
Indian legal films
Juries in fiction
Indian courtroom films
Films about capital punishment
Films about discrimination
Fiction about murder
1980s legal films
Indian remakes of American films
Twelve Angry Men